Bramdean Common is near Winchester, Hampshire, England.

Bramdean means "the valley where brooms grow" - broom being the gorse bush originally prevalent in the valley that carries a yellow flower. There was a Roman villa near the village, excavated in 1823, by the Greenwood family of Brockwood (then Brookwood) Park. The name goes back to 923. It is close to Hinton Ampner. There is a Church in the Wood which was built in 1883, by the Reverend Alfred Caesar Bishop, for the farm workers of Bramdean Common. The church later became used by Romany families, who camped on the Common, and practised charcoal burning on the land. It is built of corrugated iron and took five weeks to construct.

It was here in 1993 that the Dongas road protest group moved after being driven from Twyford Down by bulldozers.

References

Winchester